Manica Diamonds F.C. are a football team from Mutare, Zimbabwe, currently playing in the Zimbabwe Premier Soccer League.

Diamonds were founded in late 2017 after Zimbabwe Consolidated Diamonds Company decided to form the club to help the community. Luke Masomere was named the club's first technical director. They started out in the 2018 Eastern Division zone, Zimbabwe's regional second division.

The Gem Boys were promoted after winning the 2018 Eastern Division zone with an undefeated record of 26-4-0.

They announced their signings ahead of the Premier Soccer League season on 8 January 2019, including their highlight signing of Partson Jaure, a former captain for the Warriors.
On 3 Oct 2022, Manica Diamonds sacked Manager, Johanisi Nhumwa after a poor run of results.

References

Football clubs in Zimbabwe